Ouachita Christian School is a private K–12 Christian school in Monroe, Louisiana.

Athletics
Ouachita Christian High athletics competes in the LHSAA.

State championships
Football (8) State Championships: 1985, 1997, 2000, 2011, 2012, 2014, 2019
Baseball (8) State Championships: 1987, 1997, 2005, 2008, 2010, 2012, 2015, 2019
Boys' Track (1) State Championship: 2012
Girls' Track (3) State Championships: 2009, 2011, 2012

Notable alumni
 Julia Letlow, U.S. Representative from Louisiana's 5th congressional district
 Luke Letlow, Member-elect of the United States House of Representatives
 Rudy Niswanger, NFL player
 Shane Reynolds, MLB player
 Sadie Robertson, reality TV star, member of Duck Dynasty

Notable faculty
Kay Robertson, mother of some of the Robertson Family from Duck Dynasty

Stan Humphries, former NFL quarterback for the Washington Redskins and San Diego Chargers.

References

Christian schools in Louisiana
Schools in Ouachita Parish, Louisiana